Amy Dalley is an American country music artist. Signed to Curb Records in 2003, she left the label in 2008. Dalley has released seven singles, of which five have entered the U.S. Billboard Hot Country Songs charts despite never releasing an album. Her highest-peaking single is "Men Don't Change", which reached a peak of No. 23 in 2004. In addition to her own music, Dalley co-wrote Reba McEntire's single "My Sister". Her album, It's Time, was issued independently via digital retailers and as well as a physical copy in 2009.

Biography
Dalley's first musical performance was at a talent show at her high school. She continued to perform around her hometown of Kingsport, Tennessee. After briefly attending East Tennessee State University, she went on to perform at the Dollywood amusement park. In 1994, she moved to Nashville, Tennessee and formed a band called the Gypsy Hillbillies, which toured nationally. She was later signed to a publishing deal at Hamstein Music. One of her songs, "Dream Too Small", was featured in an episode of Dawson's Creek.

Dalley's first single, "Love's Got an Attitude (It Is What It Is)", was released in 2003, peaking at No. 27 on the country charts. It was followed by "I Think You're Beautiful" at No. 43 and her highest-charting single, "Men Don't Change" at No. 23. After the release of the latter, she was slated to release her self-titled debut album, on which "Love's Got an Attitude" and "I Think You're Beautiful" were not included. The album's second single and her fourth overall, the No. 29 "I Would Cry", charted in 2005, and her album was delayed again. Later that same year, Reba McEntire charted the single "My Sister", which Dalley co-wrote with Roxie Dean.

In 2006, Dalley released "Good Kind of Crazy", which spent one week at No. 60 on the charts, and "Let's Try Goodbye", which did not chart either. She left Curb in 2008. She finally released her album It's Time through her label Mad Jack Records, on January 19, 2009, through online musical vendors. This album includes "Let's Try Goodbye" and "Men Don't Change".

Amy released her second album Coming Out of the Pain on her label Mad Jack Records in 2011. It was re-released in 2012 on Rock Ridge Records.

Discography

Albums

Singles

Music videos

References

External links
Official website
Amy Dalley's Mom's Making Music Site

Living people
People from Kingsport, Tennessee
American women country singers
American country singer-songwriters
Curb Records artists
East Tennessee State University alumni
Year of birth missing (living people)
Singer-songwriters from Tennessee
Country musicians from Tennessee
21st-century American women